Arthur B. White (born 1933) is an English stage and screen actor, best known for his occasional role as the collator (police archivist) Ernie Trigg in the crime drama A Touch of Frost, alongside his real-life younger brother David Jason. His parents were Arthur R White and Welsh-born Olwen Jones. He also appeared briefly along with his brother in two episodes of The Darling Buds of May.

In 1978, White appeared as part of an underworld gang, playing the role of Freddy in an episode of the 1970s British police drama The Professionals, the episode entitled When the Heat Cools Off.

In 2007, White played Albert Fogarty in the Heartbeat episode "The Dreams That Make You Dream." In 2008, he worked with Jason again on the comic fantasy The Colour of Magic, where he played a character called "Rerpf". 

White has also made appearances in television series such as Crossroads, The Professionals, London's Burning, As Time Goes By, Wycliffe, Family Affairs and The Prisoner episode: “It's Your Funeral”.

References

External links
 

1933 births
Living people
People from Finchley
English male stage actors
English male television actors
English people of Welsh descent